Jeno's Pizza may refer to:

Jeno's, brand of frozen pizza products founded by Jeno Paulucci and operated by General Mills' Jeno's / Totino's division
Jeno's Pizza (Colombia), a Colombian pizzeria chain owned by Telepizza

See also
Gino's East, Chicago-based pizzeria chain
Gino's Pizza and Spaghetti, pizzeria chain in West Virginia
Papa Gino's, restaurant chain based in Dedham, Massachusetts, USA